The men's shot put event at the 2003 IAAF World Indoor Championships was held on March 14.

Medalists

Results

Qualification
Qualifying performance 20.25 (Q) or 8 best performers (q) advanced to the Final.

Final

References
Results

Shot
Shot put at the World Athletics Indoor Championships